Dino Radoš (born 1 October 1991) is a Croatian professional basketball player for Jazine Arbanasi.

References

External links 
 Dino Rados at eurobasket.com

1991 births
Living people
Croatian men's basketball players
Croatian expatriate basketball people in North Macedonia
KK Gorica players
KK Vardar players
KK Zagreb players
KK Vrijednosnice Osijek players
Power forwards (basketball)
Sportspeople from Osijek
KK Alkar players